Joe Martey (born 23 June 1944) is a Ghanaian boxer. He competed in the men's lightweight event at the 1968 Summer Olympics. At the 1968 Summer Olympics, he lost to Enzo Petriglia of Italy.

References

External links
 

1944 births
Living people
Ghanaian male boxers
Olympic boxers of Ghana
Boxers at the 1968 Summer Olympics
People from Volta Region
Lightweight boxers
Commonwealth Games medallists in boxing
Commonwealth Games silver medallists for Ghana
Boxers at the 1974 British Commonwealth Games
Medallists at the 1974 British Commonwealth Games